Deborah L. Halvorson (born March 1, 1958) is an American politician who served as the U.S. representative for  from 2009 until 2011. Previously, she served in the Illinois Senate from 1997 through 2009. She is a member of the Democratic Party. In September 2011, she filed to run in the newly redistricted 2nd congressional district but was defeated in the Democratic primary by the incumbent, Jesse Jackson Jr.

Early life, education, and early career
Halvorson grew up in Steger, Illinois and graduated from Bloom High School. She and her husband Jim Bush live in Crete and have four children and four grandchildren. She worked 13 years as a cosmetics saleswoman for Mary Kay before entering public service. She has degrees from Robert Morris College, Prairie State College and Governors State University (Bachelor of Arts and Master's in Communication). She became a sales representative, Crete Township Clerk, and an educator at the Governors State University.

Illinois Senate (1997–2009)

Elections
Halvorson first ran for the Illinois State Senate in November 1996, defeating incumbent Republican State Senator Aldo DeAngelis 56%–44% in Illinois' 40th Senate District. In 1998, she won re-election to a second term defeating State Representative Flora Ciarlo 66%–34%. In 2002, she won re-election to a third term unopposed. In 2006, she won re-election to a fourth term with 70% of the vote.

Tenure
In 2005, Halvorson became the first female Majority Leader of the Illinois State Senate.

After being diagnosed as a high risk for cervical cancer due to HPV, Halvorson gained special notoriety and controversy by creating a program intended to broaden access to HPV testing and vaccination.

Halvorson had a public dispute with Jesse Jackson, Jr., over the proposed Peotone airport, which led Jackson to attempt to tie Halvorson to Tony Rezko. The airport has never been in Jackson's district.

Following Halvorson's election to the House, there was an ongoing process, narrowed to three possible candidates, for Halvorson's successor in the Illinois Senate; she was eventually replaced by Toi Hutchinson. Just before Halvorson was set to officially resign from her seat, Governor Rod Blagojevich was arrested. Halvorson said, "As frustrated and disappointed as I was, I was not surprised." She also called for Blagojevich to resign.

Committee assignments
Senate Committee of the Whole
Senate Committee on Agriculture & Conservation
Senate Committee on Transportation
Senate Subcommittee on Airports (Chairperson)
Senate Subcommittee on Tollways (Chairperson)
Subcommittee on Railroad Safety
Senate Taskforce on Alcoholic Beverages

U.S. House of Representatives (2009–2011)

Elections
2008

In September 2007, incumbent Republican U.S. Congressman Jerry Weller announced that he would not seek another term, citing the need to spend more time with his family. Halvorson won the open seat against Republican businessman Marty Ozinga with 58% of the vote, while Ozinga only got 34%.  In 2020, Ozinga's son, Tim Ozinga, was elected to the Illinois House of Representatives.

2010

Halvorson lost to Republican nominee Adam Kinzinger 58%–42%. Despite her landslide victory two years earlier, this was the fifth-largest margin of defeat for a Democratic house incumbent in 2010.

2012

In September 2011, Halvorson filed a candidacy with the FEC to run in the newly redistricted Illinois's 2nd congressional district, against incumbent Democrat Jesse Jackson, Jr. “He (Jackson) lives in D.C. He doesn’t come home on weekends. His kids go to school in D.C." She also said that “They should be fearing me becoming a congresswoman. I represent the people who live in the (current) 11th district. He’s just nervous that I’m going to become a congresswoman because then his control is over.” The newly drawn district is just 54% African American. Jackson defeated her 71%–29%.

2013

On November 21, 2012, Jesse Jackson Jr. resigned from office. Halvorson announced her candidacy on November 26  but lost the primary election on February 26, 2013.

Tenure 
On October 2, 2007, Halvorson announced her decision to run for Illinois's 11th congressional district in the United States House of Representatives, after current incumbent Jerry Weller announced in September that he would not be running for re-election. EMILY's List endorsed Halvorson in November. In February 2008, Republican nominee, New Lenox Mayor Tim Baldermann, withdrew from the race, citing other obligations. He was replaced by Marty Ozinga, whom Halvorson easily defeated in the general election.

Halvorson was appointed to the powerful Steering and Policy Committee as well as a member of Veterans, Small Business and Agriculture.  One of her true loves is Economic Development and Transportation. During her time in office she said that one of her main focuses were constituent services. She has agreed with the 2009 Economic Stimulus Act, Cap and Trade of Emissions, and the Federal Health Care Bill.

Committee assignments
Committee on Agriculture
Subcommittee on Conservation, Credit, Energy, and Research
Subcommittee on General Farm Commodities and Risk Management
Committee on Small Business
Subcommittee on Finance and Tax
Subcommittee on Contracting and Technology
United States House Small Business Subcommittee on Veterans' Affairs
Subcommittee on Disability and Memorial Affairs

Electoral history

See also
 Women in the United States House of Representatives

References

External links
Halvorson for Congress official campaign site
 
Collected news and commentary from the Chicago Tribune
Senator Debbie Halvorson (D) 40th District at the Illinois General Assembly, 95th session
Bills Committees

Democratic Party Illinois state senators
1958 births
Living people
Robert Morris University Illinois alumni
Prairie State College alumni
Governors State University alumni
People from Chicago Heights, Illinois
Female members of the United States House of Representatives
Women state legislators in Illinois
American Lutherans
2004 United States presidential electors
2008 United States presidential electors
2012 United States presidential electors
Democratic Party members of the United States House of Representatives from Illinois
21st-century American politicians
21st-century American women politicians
People from Steger, Illinois
People from Crete, Illinois